LMNOP are the twelfth through sixteenth letters of the ISO basic Latin alphabet and may refer to that alphabet as a whole.

LMNOP may refer to:
 Elemeno P, a New Zealand rock band
 Elemeno P (album), the band's third studio album
 Ella Minnow Pea, a novel by Mark Dunn
 Elemeno Pea, a play by Molly Smith Metzler